The First Deputy Prime Minister is a member of the Government of Kazakhstan. The First Deputy, just like the Deputy Prime Minister, serves as a role of carrying out policies that are established by the Prime Minister. However, in contrast to the Deputy Prime Minister, the First Deputy is more of a higher position that takes over the leading role if the Prime Minister is unable to do his or her job. The post is appointed by the President of Kazakhstan.

List

References

Sources 
primeminister.kz
online.zakon.kz

Government of Kazakhstan
Deputy Prime Ministers of Kazakhstan